Sisters Creek is a locality and small rural community in the local government areas of Waratah-Wynyard and Circular Head, in the North-west and west region of Tasmania. The Bass Highway passes through from east to west, and the watercourse named Sisters Creek flows through from south to north. The 2016 census determined a population of 134 for the state suburb of Sisters Creek.

History
An 1851 map of Tasmania names a range of hills in the vicinity as the “Sisters”. The name seems to have been applied to the nearby creek. The hills were subsequently officially named “Two Sisters”.

Road infrastructure
The C229 route (Myalla Road) terminates at the Bass Highway in Sisters Creek.

References

Localities of Waratah–Wynyard Council
Localities of Circular Head Council
Towns in Tasmania